Tumpeng is an Indonesian cone-shaped rice dish with side dishes of vegetables and meat originating from Javanese cuisine of Indonesia. Traditionally featured in the slamatan ceremony, the rice is made by using a cone-shaped woven bamboo container. The rice itself may be plain steamed rice, uduk rice (cooked with coconut milk), or yellow rice (uduk rice colored with kunyit (turmeric)).

In 2013, the Indonesian Ministry of Tourism and Creative Economy promoted tumpeng as one of 30 Indonesian culinary icons and gave it the status of official national dish of Indonesia in 2014, describing it as "the dish that binds the diversity of Indonesian various culinary traditions."

History and tradition
People in Java, Bali and Madura usually make tumpeng to celebrate important events. However, all Indonesians are familiar with tumpeng. The philosophy of tumpeng is related to the geographical condition of Indonesia, especially Java as fertile island with numerous mountains and volcanos. Tumpeng dates back to ancient Indonesian tradition that revered mountains as the abode of hyangs, the spirit of ancestors and gods. The cone-shaped rice represents the holy mountain. The feast served as a thanksgiving for the abundance of harvest or any other blessings.

Tumpeng is a symbol of gratitude, in gratitude ceremony (syukuran or slametan), after the people pray, the top of tumpeng is cut and delivered to the most important person. He or she may be the group leader, the oldest person, or the beloved one. Then, all people in the ceremony enjoy the tumpeng together. With tumpeng, people express the gratitude to God and appreciate togetherness and harmony. An annual ceremony involving tumpeng is commonly called 'tumpengan'.

Tumpengs and gunungans are an essential part in the Javanese festival sekaten, huge and large amount of tumpengs are included in a big traditional parade from the palace to the grand mosque. They are prayed upon in the grand mosque, and then distributed to the people as part of the festivities celebrating the birth of the prophet Mohammed.

In modern times, the top of the tumpeng is given to an honoured guest in social events, ceremonies or awards. In many Indonesian cities, such as Yogyakarta, a tradition has been developed — the tumpengan ceremony the eve of 17 August — which is Indonesian independence day. The event is meant to pray for safety and welfare of the nation.

Surrounding dishes
 
The cone-shaped rice is surrounded by assorted Indonesian dishes, such as urap vegetables, ayam goreng (fried chicken), ayam bakar (grilled chicken), empal gepuk (sweet and spicy fried beef), abon sapi (beef floss), semur (beef stew in sweet soy sauce), teri kacang (anchovy with peanuts), fried prawn, telur pindang (boiled marble egg), shredded omelette, tempe orek (sweet and dry fried tempeh), perkedel kentang (mashed potato fritters), perkedel jagung (corn fritters), sambal goreng ati (liver in chilli sauce), sliced cucumbers and many other things.

Traditionally there should be a balance between vegetables, egg, meat, and seafood. The composition of a traditional Javanese tumpeng is more complex because the elements must balance one another according to Javanese belief. Traditional Javanese tumpeng usually involves urap vegetables, tempeh, ayam goreng, teri kacang, fried shrimp, telur pindang, empal gepuk and sambal. After the adoption of tumpeng as the national dish, tumpeng is expected to be a dish that binds Indonesia's cooking traditions. Its side dishes might be popular Indonesian dishes, such as gado-gado, satay and rendang. Today the dishes which accompany tumpeng can be of the host's discretion.

Philosophical meaning 

There is a philosophical meaning on every part of traditional tumpeng. According to folklore in Java and Bali, the cone-shaped tumpeng is a mystic symbol of life and ecosystems. It also symbolizes the glory of God as the Creator of nature, and the side dishes and vegetables represent the life and harmony of nature. The authentic and complete tumpeng dishes should contain at least one meat to represent a land animal, fish to represent sea creatures, an egg to represent winged beasts, and vegetables that represent a food stock provided by the plant kingdom. Usually tumpeng is served with spinach as spinach is a traditional symbol of prosperity in Javanese agricultural society.

Here are the philosophical meanings behind some of the ingredients in tumpeng:

Egg: The egg is served with the shell still on. Peeling the egg before eating it symbolizes everything a person has to plan and do before becoming a good person.
Vegetables: A wrap of vegetables represents a good relationship with friends and neighbors. Spinach represents a safe and peaceful life; water spinach represents a person who could live through hardships; string beans represent a long life; and mungbean sprouts represent carrying ancestors' legacy.
 Catfish: Catfish represents the importance of preparing for troubles in the future. It also represents being humble, since catfish live on the bottom of ponds.
 Milkfish: The many bones of the milkfish represent good fortune and prosperity in the future.
 Anchovies: Because they live together, the anchovies represent having a good relationship with family and neighbors.

Variations

There are several variants of tumpeng, differentiated according to the ceremonies.
 Tumpeng Robyong — This kind of tumpeng usually served in the traditional Javanese siraman (bridal shower) ceremony. Tumpeng is placed on bakul bamboo rice container; egg, shrimp paste, shallots and red chilli are placed on top.
 Tumpeng Nujuh Bulan — This kind of tumpeng is served in the seventh month of pregnancy (prenatal ceremony). Tumpeng is made of plain white rice. A main tumpeng is surrounded by six smaller tumpeng; all tumpengs are erected on tampah covered with banana leaf.
 Tumpeng Pungkur — Used in the ceremony for the death of a virgin or unmarried male or female. It is made from white rice surrounded only with vegetables dishes. The tumpeng later must be cut vertical into two parts evenly and placed one against another.
 Tumpeng Putih — White tumpeng, uses white rice since white symbolizes holiness in Javanese culture. This kind of tumpeng is employed in sacred ceremonies.
 Tumpeng Nasi Kuning — Yellow tumpeng: The color yellow represents gold, wealth, abundance, and high morals. This kind of tumpeng is employed in cheerful and happy festivities and celebrations, such as celebration of birth, engagement, marriage, Eid, Christmas, etc.
 Tumpeng Nasi Uduk (also called tumpeng tasyakuran) — The uduk rice (rice cooked in coconut milk) employed in the Maulud Nabi ceremony: celebrating the birthday of prophet Muhammad.
 Tumpeng Seremonial/Modifikasi — This contemporary tumpeng is relatively more open for modifications and adaptations. It depends on the discretion, taste, and request of the host.
 Mini Tumpeng — This kind of small rice cone which is usually served for 1 person like a rice box, unique is a mini cone served in a unique place with a transparent mica lid, so food can be seen from the outside.
 Character Tumpeng Rice — This is usually used for birthdays or conventions, and young children and pop culture fans love it because of its unique shape, but the unique shape can also be used like a cone for a birthday celebration or fan conventions.

Contemporary tradition

Today, most Indonesians serve tumpeng as a dish to celebrate a special occasion, such as a birthday party, arisan, family or neighborhood gathering, farewell party, celebrations, recitals, and many other joyous events. Because of its festive and celebration value, up until now tumpeng sometimes seen as an Indonesian counterpart of birthday cake. Tumpeng contests are sometimes held to commemorate Indonesian Independence day on August 17 or to commemorate women's emancipation day, the Kartini on April 21. The tumpengs in this contest are judged by decoration and taste.

According to Jati in Local wisdom behind Tumpeng as an icon of Indonesian traditional cuisine, in 2004, the Republic of Indonesia's Ministry of Health rolled out a tumpeng-based food pyramid to encourage healthy eating because tumpeng includes samples of food from every food group. The meat- or soy-based sides provide iron, zinc, and protein; the vegetable side dishes provide vitamins and minerals.

In 2009 Garuda Indonesia started offering Mini Nasi Tumpeng Nusantara as part of its new concept to highlight Indonesia's hospitality.

Tumpeng is offered in Indonesian restaurants abroad, such as in neighboring Singapore and the Netherlands as well as in Kelantan.

The building of Suharto's Purna Bhakti Pertiwi Museum in Taman Mini Indonesia Indah, Jakarta, took shape of tumpeng.

See also

 Javanese cuisine
 Javanese culture
 Indonesian cuisine
 List of rice dishes
 Rice

References

External links

  Resep Nasi Tumpeng
  Philosophical meaning of tumpeng 

National dishes
Javanese cuisine
Indonesian rice dishes
Ceremonial food and drink